The National Association of Professional Martial Artists (NAPMA) is an American association for professional martial artists. It was founded in 1994 by John Graden.

NAPMA supports martial arts school owners and instructors with business plans, advertising programs, and other resources.  Perhaps best known for its customizable advertising media and "Little Ninjas" program and other programs for children, it also offers more detailed marketing and management advice for owners seeking to grow their commercial schools. The organization also publishes the monthly Martial Arts Professional magazine, also created by Graden.

NAPMA began as an independent organization but was driven into bankruptcy with lawsuits by Century Incorporated, who then purchased the company. Century Incorporated (formerly known as Century Martial Art Supply) purchased NAPMA in 2004. Century also owns NAPMA's only competitor.

The NAPMA organization was purchased by Stephen Oliver (best known as founder of Mile High Karate and as the director of an elite coaching program for martial arts schools) and Martial Arts Marketing, Inc. on August 1, 2007. Toby Milroy was added as director of Sales and Marketing.

References

External links 
NAPMA home page
NAPMA Newsletter Page
Martial Arts Professional Magazine (owned by NAPMA) 
NAPMA registration page
Lawsuit

Organizations established in 1994
Martial arts organizations
Professional associations based in the United States